Gianluca Gnecchi (born 1992 in Brescia) is an Italian rugby referee.

Career

Gnecchi refereed the 2023 Rugby World Cup qualifiers in South America, refereeing the match between Brazil and Chile on 11 July 2021.

References

Living people
1992 births
Italian rugby union referees
Sportspeople from Brescia
United Rugby Championship referees